Choi Yong-son (born 10 October 1972) is a North Korean former footballer. He represented North Korea on at least twenty-nine occasions between 1990 and 1993, scoring ten goals. He also represented the unified Korean team at the 1991 FIFA World Youth Championship.

Career statistics

International

International goals
Scores and results list North Korea's goal tally first, score column indicates score after each North Korea goal.

References

1972 births
Living people
North Korean footballers
North Korea youth international footballers
North Korea international footballers
Association football forwards
Pyongyang Sports Club players
Footballers at the 1990 Asian Games
1992 AFC Asian Cup players
Asian Games competitors for North Korea